100 Years of Girl Guides is a BBC television documentary. It was shown on the digital television station BBC Four on Sunday 16 August 2009 at 21:00. The programme was presented by Dominic West and followed the story of the Girl Guides from its beginnings up to the centenary in September 2009.

The show interviews a number of former Girl Guides from veterans to such household names as Dame Tanni Grey-Thompson, Kelly Holmes, Clare Short, Kate Silverton and Rhona Cameron. It was directed by Rosalind Bain.

References

External links

BBC television documentaries
2009 British television series debuts
Girlguiding
Centennial anniversaries